Aloa cardinalis is a moth of the family Erebidae. It was described by Arthur Gardiner Butler in 1875.

It is found on the Philippines, Sulawesi, the Tokan-Besi-Islands, Timor, Dammer, Letti-Moa, Tenimber and Bali.

The species is found in secondary habitats in the lowlands.

Adults have been recorded on wing in January, from May to July and in September.

The larvae feed Carowatti species. They are black with white spiracles and a brown head.

References

Moths described in 1875
Erebid moths of Asia
Moths of the Philippines